Idéal J originally Idéal Junior was a French rap group with members from Val-de-Marne and was active in the 1990s until its dissolution in 2001. It released two albums: O'riginal MC's sur une mission in 1996 and Le combat continue in 1998. Their most famous single is "Hardcore", a track that created huge controversy. The group was also part of the French music collective Mafia K-1 Fry.

Members
Idéal Junior was formed by an initiative of Alix Mathurin, known by his stage name Daddy Kery. The group had adopted the name in recognition of a crew of bigger brothers called Idéal, thus the name Idéal Junior for the 13- to 14-year-old original members of Idéal Junior at the time who were:
Daddy Kery (real name Alix Mathurin, now is known as the artist Kery James)
Alter MC (now is known as the rapper Jessy Money)
Bakar (now known as the rapper Rocco)
Teddy Corona (breaker and rapper)
Selim du 9.4 (real name Sélim Bélabès is a rapper of Tunisian origin)

In 1992, DJ Mehdi joined in. In 1993, Alter MC and Selim du 9.4 left the band. When the band released its debut studio album, the band consisted of Kery James, Teddy Corona and Rocco and Mehdi as DJ.

Career
Starting in the early 1990s, the formation rose in popularity after taking part in a number of music festivals. 1992 saw the release of the maxi single "La vie est brutale". The same year, DJ Mehdi joined in and became a major contributor to the music for the band. A difference between Idéal Junior members and their producer delayed the issuing of a full album as they continued touring and performing and recording some songs for Alariana, a label created by friends.

After being released from contractual obligations with their previous producer, they appeared notoriously in soundtrack of the 1995 film Raï in "Mauvais Garçon" and in "Ce soir" and also released the same year contributed to a mixtape entitled Orly City Bronx performing its title release.

1996 saw the release of their long-awaited album entitled O'riginal MC's sur une mission. The band rebaptized Ideal J was made up of Kery James, Teddy Corona and Rocco at the time. It became renowned and respected as one of the top French rap formations  with well-known tracks like "Le ghetto français", "Show bizness" and "Je dois faire du cash" and a number of versions of "Ghettolude". Ideal J became popular in maxi releases as frequently featured acts, reaching fame with the single "J'désole mes parents" present on the compilation Nouvelle donne.

A second album followed in 1998 called Le combat continue. It contained great collaborations from other artists mainly through the collective Mafia K-1 Fry including Rohff, Demon One, AP, Karlito, Dry, OGB. Others included Hasheem, Zahariya, Leila, Different Teep etc. Kery worked extensively on writing new material, his texts reflecting a life that involved altercations with the police, street rivalries and an omnipresent fear of death.

The band also faced many controversies for their lyrics. Their single "Hardcore" was banned from mainstream radio, and the music video for the song had to be withdrawn and some images removed before being re-released. "Hardcore" became a classic French rap reference track with lyrics about the French police, black policemen ("Les flics noirs ne sont que des traîtres et j'en bave de rage"), homosexuals ("Deux pédés qui s'embrassent en plein Paris, Hardcore") considered within the context of the song a homophobic slander), and news items like deforestation, war in Yugoslavia, the right-wing Front National, the Ku Klux Klan, or historic context like the French Revolution, colonisation, World War II etc. Another controversial release was "Pour une poignée de dollars". The band's success was reflected in Idéal J, in particular Kery James becoming a spokesman for youth and became notorious with his provocative opinions about homosexuality, the record industry and youth problems.

Idéal J was dessimated by departure of members, death of Montana, a close friend of his called Las Montana in very tragic circumstances in 1999 after which he decided to stop performing after a final concert in Élysée Montmartre in 1999. The official splitting of the band was announced in 2001.

After split-up
After the split-up most members went on to have good musical careers. Kery James became more involved in the Muslim community after the death of Montana. In fact, his release of a solo album Si c'était à refaire... in 2001 marked the end of the band Idéal J. The album included long complaining diatribes towards his life and became certified gold. In 2005, he released another album Ma vérité in which he included part of "Hardcore" the definitive single of the band. He has gone from strength to strength with À l'ombre du show business certified platinum in 2008 and Réel in 2009 which was certified double platinum.
The Tunisian-French Mehdi Favéris-Essadi known as DJ Mehdi, the band's DJ also released his debut solo album with electro and house influences immediately following the break-up of the band. His debut solo album was called (The Story of) Espion followed in 2005 in a joint album with Kourtrajmé called Des friandises pour ta bouche. In 2006, he had his solo album Lucky Boy and in 2007 Lucky Boy at Night and finally Red Black & Blue in 2009 before dying tragically on 13 September 2011.
Teddy Corona remained one of the main members of Mafia K-1 Fry and started the musical project Street Lourd Hall Stars with Small Records, and a compilation of works was released in November 2004, with tracks by DJ Mosko, Mista Flo, and Rocco. A second compilation album Street Lourd Hall Stars II was released in July 2010.
Bakar, now called Rocco is still a member of Mafia K-1 Fry. He is also part of the group of musicians from Orly, Vitry-sur-Seine and Choisy-le-Roi. Although he has stopped rapping, he takes care of the artistic productions of the members of the group.
Selim du 9.4, real name Sélim Bélabès, has remained close with Mafia K-1 Fry and appeared in two consequent compilations of the collective. His brother 'Rak is also a well-known rapper associated with the collective.

Discography

Studio albums

Maxis
1992:  (credited to Idéal Junior)

Maxis and Singles

References

External links
Discogs

French hip hop groups
Musical groups from Île-de-France